Russell Ira Crowe (born 7 April 1964) is an actor. He was born in New Zealand, spent ten years of his childhood in Australia, and moved there permanently at age twenty one. He came to international attention for his role as Roman General Maximus Decimus Meridius in the epic historical film Gladiator (2000), for which he won an Academy Award, Broadcast Film Critics Association Award, Empire Award, and London Film Critics Circle Award for Best Leading Actor, along with 10 other nominations in the same category.

Crowe's other award-winning performances include tobacco firm whistle-blower Jeffrey Wigand in the drama film The Insider (1999) and mathematician John Forbes Nash Jr. in the biopic A Beautiful Mind (2001). He has also starred in films such as the drama Romper Stomper (1992), the mystery-detective thriller L.A. Confidential (1997), the epic war film Master and Commander: The Far Side of the World (2003), the biographical boxing drama Cinderella Man (2005), the Western 3:10 to Yuma (2007), the crime drama American Gangster (2007), the thriller-drama State of Play (2009), and Robin Hood (2010).

Crowe later starred in the musical drama Les Misérables (2012), as Jor-El in the superhero epic Man of Steel (2013), the biblical fantasy drama Noah (2014), the action comedy The Nice Guys (2016), portrayed Zeus Panhellenios in the Marvel Cinematic Universe (MCU) film Thor: Love and Thunder (2022), and will star in the upcoming Sony's Spider-Man Universe (SSU) film Kraven The Hunter (2023). In 2014, he made his directorial debut with the drama The Water Diviner, in which he also starred. He has earned various accolades, including a star on the Hollywood Walk of Fame, two Golden Globe Awards, a British Academy Film Award, and an Academy Award out of three consecutive nominations (1999, 2000, and 2001). He has been the co-owner of the National Rugby League (NRL) team South Sydney Rabbitohs since 2006.

Early life
Crowe was born in the Wellington suburb of Strathmore Park on 7 April 1964, the son of film set caterers Jocelyn Yvonne (née Wemyss) and John Alexander Crowe. His father also managed a hotel. His maternal grandfather, Stan Wemyss, was a cinematographer who was appointed an MBE for filming footage of World War II as a member of the New Zealand Film Unit. Crowe is Māori, and identifies with Ngāti Porou through one of his maternal great-great-grandmothers. His paternal grandfather, John Doubleday Crowe, was a Welsh man from Wrexham, while another of his grandparents was Scottish. His other ancestry includes English, German, Irish, Italian, Norwegian, and Swedish. He is a cousin of former New Zealand national cricket captains Martin and Jeff Crowe, and the nephew of cricketer Dave Crowe.

When Crowe was four years old, his family moved to Australia and settled in Sydney, where his parents pursued their career in film set catering. His mother's godfather was the producer of the Australian TV series Spyforce, and Crowe was hired for a line of dialogue in one episode of the series at age five or six, opposite series star Jack Thompson. Later, in 1994, Thompson would play the father of Crowe's character in The Sum of Us. Crowe also appeared briefly in the serial The Young Doctors. In Australia, he was educated at Vaucluse Public School and Sydney Boys High School, before his family moved back to New Zealand in 1978 when he was 14. He continued his secondary education at Auckland Grammar School, with his cousins and brother Terry, and Mount Roskill Grammar School before leaving school at the age of 16 to pursue his acting ambitions.

Acting career

New Zealand

Under guidance from his good friend Tom Sharplin, Crowe began his performing career as a musician in the early 1980s performing under the stage name "Russ Le Roq". He released several New Zealand singles including "I Just Wanna Be Like Marlon Brando", "Pier 13", and "Shattered Glass", none of which charted. He managed an Auckland music venue called "The Venue" in 1984. When he was 18, he was featured in A Very Special Person..., a promotional video for the theology/ministry course at Avondale University, a Seventh-day Adventist tertiary education provider in New South Wales, Australia.

Australia
Crowe left New Zealand and returned to Australia at the age of 21, intending to apply to the National Institute of Dramatic Art. He said, "I was working in a theatre show, and talked to a guy who was then the head of technical support at NIDA. I asked him what he thought about me spending three years at NIDA. He told me it'd be a waste of time. He said, 'You already do the things you go there to learn, and you've been doing it for most of your life, so there's nothing to teach you but bad habits.'" From 1986 to 1988, he was given his first professional role by director Daniel Abineri, in a New Zealand production of The Rocky Horror Show. He played the role of Eddie/Dr Scott. He repeated this performance in a further Australian production of the show, which also toured New Zealand. In 1987, Crowe spent six months busking when he could not find other work. In the 1988 Australian production of Blood Brothers, Crowe played the role of Mickey. He was also cast again by Daniel Abineri in the role of Johnny, in the stage musical Bad Boy Johnny and the Prophets of Doom in 1989.

After appearing in the TV series Neighbours and Living with the Law, Crowe was cast by Faith Martin in his first film, The Crossing (1990), a small-town love triangle directed by George Ogilvie. Before production started, a film-student protégé of Ogilvie, Steve Wallace, hired Crowe for the 1990 film Blood Oath (aka Prisoners of the Sun), which was released a month earlier than The Crossing, although actually filmed later. In 1992, Crowe starred in the first episode of the second series of Police Rescue. Also in 1992, Crowe starred in Romper Stomper, an Australian film which followed the exploits and downfall of a racist skinhead group in blue-collar suburban Melbourne, directed by Geoffrey Wright and co-starring Jacqueline McKenzie. For the role, Crowe won an Australian Film Institute (AFI) award for Best Actor, following up from his Best Supporting Actor award for Proof in 1991. In 2015, it was reported that Crowe had applied for Australian citizenship in 2006 and again in 2013 but was rejected because he failed to fulfill the residency requirements. However, Australia's Immigration Department said it had no record of any such application by Crowe.

North America 

After initial success in Australia, Crowe first starred in a Canadian production in 1993, For the Moment, before concentrating on American films. He co-starred with Denzel Washington in Virtuosity (the duo later appearing together in American Gangster) and with Sharon Stone in The Quick and the Dead in 1995. He went on to become a three-time Oscar nominee, winning the Academy Award as Best Actor in 2000 for Gladiator. Crowe was awarded the (Australian) Centenary Medal in 2001 for "service to Australian society and Australian film production."

Crowe received three consecutive best actor Oscar nominations, for The Insider, Gladiator, and A Beautiful Mind. Crowe won the best actor award for A Beautiful Mind at the 2002 BAFTA award ceremony, as well as the Golden Globe and Screen Actors Guild awards for the same performance. Although nominated for an Academy Award, he lost to Denzel Washington. All three films were also nominated for Best Picture, and both Gladiator and A Beautiful Mind won the award. Crowe became the first actor to star as the lead in back-to-back Best Picture winners since Walter Pidgeon (who starred in How Green Was My Valley and Mrs. Miniver).

Within the six-year stretch from 1997 to 2003, he also starred in two other best picture nominees, L.A. Confidential and Master and Commander: The Far Side of the World. In 2005, he re-teamed with A Beautiful Mind director Ron Howard for the biographical boxing drama Cinderella Man. In 2006, he re-teamed with Gladiator director Ridley Scott for A Good Year, the first of two consecutive collaborations (the second being American Gangster co-starring again with Denzel Washington, released in late 2007). Although the light romantic comedy of A Good Year was not greatly received, Crowe seemed pleased with the film, telling STV in an interview that he thought it would be enjoyed by fans of his other films.

In recent years, Crowe's box office standing has declined. The Hollywood stock market (HSX) share Russell Crowe (RCROW), issued in 1998, however, maintains constant accretion. Crowe appeared in Robin Hood, a film based on the Robin Hood legend, directed by Ridley Scott and released on 14 May 2010.
Crowe starred in the 2010 Paul Haggis film The Next Three Days, an adaptation of the 2008 French film Pour Elle.

After a year off from acting, Crowe played Jackknife in The Man with the Iron Fists, opposite RZA. He took on the role of Javert in the musical film of Les Misérables (2012), and portrayed Superman's biological father, Jor-El, in the Christopher Nolan-produced film, Man of Steel, released in the summer of 2013. In 2014, he played a gangster in the film adaptation of Mark Helprin's 1983 novel Winter's Tale, and the title role in the Darren Aronofsky film Noah. In June 2013, Crowe signed to make his directorial debut with an historical drama film The Water Diviner, which he also starred in alongside Jacqueline McKenzie, Olga Kurylenko, Jai Courtney. Set in the year 1919, the film was produced by Troy Lum, Andrew Mason and Keith Rodger. Crowe had a major role in The Mummy (2017). Crowe portrayed Zeus in the Marvel Cinematic Universe film Thor: Love and Thunder, which was released on 8 July 2022. He portrays the famous exorcist Fr. Gabriele Amorth in The Pope's Exorcist (2023).

Music 

In the 1980s, Crowe, under the name of "Russ le Roq", recorded a song titled "I Want to Be Like Marlon Brando".

In the 1980s, Crowe and friend Billy Dean Cochran formed a band, Roman Antix, which later evolved into the Australian rock band 30 Odd Foot of Grunts (abbreviated to TOFOG). Crowe performed lead vocals and guitar for the band, which formed in 1992. The band released The Photograph Kills EP in 1995, as well as three full-length records, Gaslight (1998), Bastard Life or Clarity (2001) and Other Ways of Speaking (2003). In 2000, TOFOG performed shows in London, Los Angeles and in Austin, Texas. In 2001, the band toured in the U.S. with dates in Austin, Boulder, Chicago, Portland, San Francisco, Hollywood, Philadelphia, New York City and the last show at The Stone Pony in Asbury Park, New Jersey.

In early 2005, Thirty Odd Foot of Grunts as a group had "dissolved/evolved" with Crowe feeling his future music would take a new direction. He began a collaboration with Alan Doyle of the Canadian band Great Big Sea, and with it a new band emerged: The Ordinary Fear of God which also involved some members of the previous TOFOG line-up. A new single, Raewyn, was released in April 2005 and an album entitled My Hand, My Heart was released. The album includes a tribute song to actor Richard Harris, who became Crowe's friend during the making of Gladiator.

Crowe and his new band The Ordinary Fear of God (keeping the TOFOG acronym) toured Australia in 2005, and then in the U.S. in 2006, returned to the US to promote their new release My Hand, My Heart. In March 2010, the group's version of the John Williamson song "Winter Green" was included on a new compilation album The Absolute Best of John Williamson: 40 Years True Blue, commemorating the singer-songwriter's milestone of 40 years in the Australian music industry.

On 2 August 2011, the third collaboration between Crowe and Doyle was released on iTunes as The Crowe/Doyle Songbook Vol III, featuring nine original songs followed by their acoustic demo counterparts (for a total of 18 tracks). Danielle Spencer does guest vocals on most tracks. The release coincided with a pair of live performances at the LSPU Hall in St. John's, Newfoundland and Labrador, Canada. The digital album was released as download versions only on Amazon.com, iTunes, Spotify. The album has since charted at No. 72 on the Canadian Albums Chart.

On 26 September 2011, Crowe appeared onstage at Rogers Arena in Vancouver in the middle of Keith Urban's concert. He sang a cover of "Folsom Prison Blues", before joining the rest of the band in a rendition of "The Joker". On 18 August 2012, Crowe appeared along with Doyle at the Harpa Concert Hall in Reykjavík, Iceland as part of the city's Menningarnótt program.

In 2017, Crowe and Doyle had created a new act (with Samantha Barks, Scott Grimes and Carl Falk) called Indoor Garden Party who appeared on The One Show to promote their album called The Musical.

Philanthropy 

During location filming of Cinderella Man, Crowe made a donation to a Jewish elementary school whose library had been damaged as a result of arson. A note with an anti-Semitic message had been left at the scene. Crowe called school officials to express his concern and wanted his message relayed to the students. The school's building fund received donations from throughout Canada and the amount of Crowe's donation was not disclosed.

On another occasion, Crowe donated $200,000 to a struggling primary school near his home in rural Australia. The money went towards an $800,000 project to construct a swimming pool at the school. Crowe's sympathies were sparked when a pupil drowned at the nearby Coffs Harbour beach in 2001, and he felt the pool would help students become better swimmers and improve their water safety. At the opening ceremony, he dived into the pool fully clothed as soon as it was declared open. Nana Glen principal Laurie Renshall said, "The many things he does up here, people just don't know about. We've been trying to get a pool for 10 years."

In August 2020, Crowe donated $5,000 to a fundraiser on GoFundMe by filmmaker Amanda Bailly and journalist Richard Hall to help rebuild Le Chef, a restaurant which was destroyed in the 2020 Beirut explosion. The fundraiser aimed to raise $15,000, but it raised approximately $19,000 as of 16 August. In response to Hall noting the donation, Crowe tweeted: "On behalf of Anthony Bourdain. I thought he probably would have done so if he was still around. I wish you and Le Chef the best and hope things can be put back together soon."

Personal life 

In 1989, Crowe met Australian singer Danielle Spencer while working on the film The Crossing and the two began an on-again, off-again relationship. In 2000, he became romantically involved with American actress Meg Ryan while working on their film Proof of Life. In 2001, Crowe and Spencer reconciled, and they married two years later in April 2003. The wedding took place at Crowe's cattle property in Nana Glen, New South Wales, with the ceremony taking place on Crowe's 39th birthday. The couple have two sons named Charles Spencer Crowe (born 21 December 2003) and Tennyson Spencer Crowe (born 7 July 2006). In October 2012, it was reported that Crowe and Spencer had separated. They divorced in April 2018.
 
A longtime resident of Nana Glen, Crowe is well known in the community and is a frequent patron of the local rugby games. During the Australian bushfires in 2019 and 2020, he raised over $400,000 for the NSW RFS by selling his South Sydney Rabbitohs hat in an online auction.

On 9 March 2005, Crowe revealed to GQ magazine that FBI agents had approached him prior to the 73rd Academy Awards and told him that the terrorist group al-Qaeda wanted to kidnap him. He recalled, "It was something to do with some recording picked up by a French policewoman, I think, in either Libya or Algiers... it was about taking iconographic Americans out of the picture as a sort of cultural destabilisation plan."

At the beginning of 2009, Crowe appeared in a series of special-edition postage stamps called "Legends of the Screen", featuring Australian actors. Crowe, Geoffrey Rush, Cate Blanchett, and Nicole Kidman each appear twice in the series, once as themselves and once as their Academy Award-nominated character. Crowe is the only non-Australian to appear in the stamps.

In June 2010, Crowe, who started smoking when he was 10, announced he had quit for the sake of his two sons. In November, he told David Letterman that he had smoked more than 60 cigarettes a day for 36 years, and that he had "fallen off the wagon" the night before the interview and smoked heavily.

On 20 December 2022, Crowe was appointed by the mayor of Rome, ambassador of Rome in the world.
On the day of the appointment, Crowe declared that it would be important to host the next FIFA World Cup in Italy.

Politics
Crowe has supported the Australian Labor Party (ALP). He endorsed former Australian prime minister Julia Gillard in June 2013, and narrated an advertisement for the Labor Party's election campaign in May 2022. Crowe has been a vocal critic of Australia's immigration detention facilities, describing them as "a nation's shame" and "fucking disgraceful". In November 2017, Crowe offered to resettle displaced refugees who were held in Australia's offshore detention facility on Manus Island.

Altercations and controversies 

Between 1999 and 2005, Crowe was involved in four altercations, which gave him a reputation for having a bad temper.

In 1999, Crowe was involved in a scuffle at the Plantation Hotel in Coffs Harbour, which was caught on a security camera. Two men were acquitted of using the video in an attempt to blackmail him.

In 2002, when part of Crowe's appearance at that year's BAFTA Awards was cut out to fit into the BBC's tape-delayed broadcast, Crowe used strong language during an argument with producer Malcolm Gerrie. The part cut was a Patrick Kavanagh poem in tribute to actor Richard Harris, which was cut for copyright reasons. Crowe later apologised, saying, "What I said to him may have been a little bit more passionate than now, in the cold light of day, I would have liked it to have been." 

Later in 2002, Crowe was alleged to have been involved in a brawl with businessman Eric Watson inside the London branch of Zuma, a Japanese restaurant chainthe fight was broken up by English actor Ross Kemp.

In June 2005, Crowe was arrested and charged with second-degree assault by the NYPD after he threw a telephone at the concierge of the Mercer Hotel who had refused to help him place a call when the system did not work from Crowe's room. He was also charged with fourth-degree criminal possession of a weapon (the telephone). The concierge was treated for a facial laceration. After his arrest, Crowe underwent a perp walk, a procedure customary in New York City, exposing the handcuffed suspect to the news media to take pictures. This procedure was under discussion as potentially violating Article 5 of the Universal Declaration of Human Rights. Crowe later described the incident as "possibly the most shameful situation that I've ever gotten myself in". Crowe pleaded guilty and was conditionally discharged. Before the trial, he settled a lawsuit filed by the concierge, Nestor Estrada. Terms of the settlement were not disclosed, but amounts in the six-figure range have been reported.

The telephone incident had a generally negative impact on Crowe's public image, an example of negative public relations in the mass media, although Crowe had made a point of befriending Australian journalists in an effort to influence his image. The South Park episode "The New Terrance and Phillip Movie Trailer" revolves around a lampooning of his aggressive tendencies. Crowe commented on the ongoing media coverage in November 2010, during an interview with American television talk show host and journalist Charlie Rose: "I think it indelibly changed me. It was a very, very minor situation that was made into something outrageous. More violence perpetuated me walking between the car to the courtroom with the waiting media than anything I'd done ... it very definitely affected me ... psychologically."

On February 23, 2023, Crowe and his partner Britney Theriot were refused service in Mr. Miyagi, an Asian-Fusion restaurant in Melbourne. Crowe was reportedly denied service due to wearing a polo shirt, which is not in line with the restaurant's strict dress code. The owner of the venue released a statement apologizing to Crowe and his partner and invited them back to the restaurant.

Sport

Rugby league 
He has been the co-owner of the National Rugby League (NRL) team South Sydney Rabbitohs since 2006. Crowe has been a supporter of the rugby league football team the South Sydney Rabbitohs since childhood. After his rise to fame as an actor, he has continued appearing at home games and supported the financially troubled club. Following the Super League war of the 1990s, he made an attempt to use his Hollywood connections to convince Ted Turner, a rival of Super League's Rupert Murdoch, to save the Rabbitohs before they were forced from the NRL competition for two years. In 1999, Crowe paid $42,000 at auction for the brass bell used to open the inaugural rugby league match in Australia in 1908 at a fundraiser to assist Souths' legal battle for re-inclusion in the league. In 2005, he made the Rabbitohs the first club team in Australia to be sponsored by a film, when he negotiated a deal to advertise his film Cinderella Man on their jerseys.
On 19 March 2006, the voting members of the South Sydney club voted (in a 75.8% majority) to allow Crowe and businessman Peter Holmes à Court to purchase 75% of the organisation, leaving 25% ownership with the members. It cost them A$3 million, and they received four of eight seats on the board of directors. A six-part television miniseries entitled South Side Story depicting the takeover aired in Australia in 2007.
On 5 November 2006, Crowe appeared on The Tonight Show with Jay Leno to announce that Firepower International was sponsoring the South Sydney Rabbitohs for $3 million over three years. During a Tonight Show with Jay Leno appearance, Crowe showed viewers a Rabbitoh playing jersey with Firepower's name emblazoned on it.

Crowe helped to organise a rugby league game that took place at the University of North Florida, in Jacksonville, Florida, between the South Sydney Rabbitohs and the 2007 Super League Grand Final winners the Leeds Rhinos on 26 January 2008 (Australia Day). Crowe told ITV Local Yorkshire the game was not a marketing exercise.
Crowe wrote a letter of apology to a Sydney newspaper following the sacking of South Sydney's coach Jason Taylor and one of their players David Fa'alogo after a drunken altercation between the two at the end of the 2009 NRL season.
Also in 2009, Crowe persuaded young England international forward Sam Burgess to sign with the Rabbitohs over other clubs that were competing for his signature, after inviting Burgess and his mother to the set of Robin Hood, which he was filming in Britain at the time.

Crowe's influence helped to persuade noted player Greg Inglis to renege on his deal to join the Brisbane Broncos and sign for the Rabbitohs for 2011.
In 2010, the NRL was investigating Crowe's business relationships with a number of media and entertainment companies including Channel Nine, Channel Seven, ANZ Stadium and V8 Supercars in relation to the South Sydney Rabbitohs' salary cap.

In 2011, Souths also announced a corporate partnership with the bookmaking conglomerate Luxbet.
Previously, Crowe had been prominent in trying to prevent gambling being associated with the Rabbitohs.
In May 2011, Crowe helped arrange to have Fox broadcast the 2011 State of Origin series live for the first time in the United States, in addition to the NRL Grand Final.
In November 2012 the South Sydney Rabbitohs confirmed that Russell Crowe was selling his 37.5 per cent stake in the club.
At the Rabbitohs Annual General Meeting on 3 March 2013, Chairman Nick Pappas claimed Crowe "would not be selling his shareholding in the short-to-medium term and at this stage has no intention of selling at all".

Crowe was a guest presenter at the 2013 Dally M Awards and presented the prestigious Dally M Medal to winner Cooper Cronk. Russell was present at the 2014 NRL Grand Final when the Rabbitohs won the NRL premiership for the first time in 43 years.

Other sporting interests 
Two of his cousins, Martin Crowe and Jeff Crowe, captained the New Zealand national cricket team.

Crowe watches and plays cricket, and captained the 'Australian' Team containing Steve Waugh against an English side in the 'Hollywood Ashes' Cricket Match. On 17 July 2009, Crowe took to the commentary box for British sports channel Sky Sports as the 'third man' during the second Test of the 2009 Ashes series, between England and Australia.

Crowe is a fan of the New Zealand All Blacks rugby team.

He is friends with Lloyd Carr, the former coach of the University of Michigan Wolverines American football team, and Carr used Crowe's movie Cinderella Man to motivate his 2006 team following a 7–5 season the previous year. Upon hearing of this, Crowe called Carr and invited him to Australia to address his rugby league team, the South Sydney Rabbitohs, which Carr did the following summer. In September 2007, after Carr came under fire following the Wolverines' 0–2 start, Crowe travelled to Ann Arbor, Michigan for the Wolverines' 15 September game against Notre Dame to show his support for Carr. He addressed the team before the game and watched from the sidelines as the Wolverines defeated the Irish 38–0.
Crowe is also a fan of the National Football League. On 22 October 2007, Crowe appeared in the booth of a Monday night game between the Indianapolis Colts and the Jacksonville Jaguars.

He is also a fan of Leeds United and narrated the Take us Home: Leeds United Amazon Prime documentary.

Filmography and awards 

Crowe's most acclaimed and highest-grossing films, according to the online portal Box Office Mojo and the review aggregate site Rotten Tomatoes, include L.A. Confidential (1997), The Insider (1999), Gladiator (2000), A Beautiful Mind  (2001), Master and Commander: The Far Side of the World (2003), 3:10 to Yuma  (2007), State of Play (2009), Robin Hood (2010), Les Misérables  (2012), Man of Steel (2013), Noah (2014), The Nice Guys (2016), The Mummy (2017), and Thor: Love and Thunder (2022).

Crowe won an Academy Award in the Best Actor category for his performance in Gladiator, and has been nominated two more times for Best Actor for The Insider and A Beautiful Mind, making him the ninth actor to have received three consecutive Academy Award nominations. He won the Golden Globe Award for Best Actor – Motion Picture Drama for A Beautiful Mind and Best Actor – Miniseries or Television Film for The Loudest Voice (2019); He has been nominated four more times: Best Actor in a Drama for The Insider, Gladiator, Master and Commander: The Far Side of the World, and Cinderella Man.

See also

List of NRL club owners
Russell Crowe's jockstrap

References

External links

 
  with stv.tv, November 2007
 

1964 births
20th-century New Zealand male actors
20th-century New Zealand male singers
21st-century New Zealand male actors
21st-century New Zealand male singers
Best Actor AACTA Award winners
Best Actor Academy Award winners
Best Actor BAFTA Award winners
Best Drama Actor Golden Globe (film) winners
Best Miniseries or Television Movie Actor Golden Globe winners
Best Supporting Actor AACTA Award winners
Living people
Male actors from Sydney
Male actors from Wellington City
Musicians from Wellington
New Zealand Christians
New Zealand emigrants to Australia
New Zealand expatriate actors in the United States
New Zealand film directors
New Zealand film producers
New Zealand male film actors
New Zealand male television actors
New Zealand monarchists
New Zealand people of English descent
New Zealand people of Italian descent
New Zealand people of Māori descent
New Zealand people of Norwegian descent
New Zealand people of Scottish descent
New Zealand people of Welsh descent
New Zealand rock singers
New Zealand rugby league chairmen and investors
Ngāti Porou people
Outstanding Performance by a Male Actor in a Leading Role Screen Actors Guild Award winners
People convicted of assault
People educated at Auckland Grammar School
People educated at Mount Roskill Grammar School
People educated at Sydney Boys High School
Recipients of the Centenary Medal
Rugby league chairmen and investors
Singers from Sydney